Jordi Arcarons (born 6 June 1962) is a former Spanish rally raid biker, six-times on podium at the Dakar Rally. Also with 27 stages won is third in this special ranking behind the French bikers Stéphane Peterhansel and Cyril Despres.

Rally Dakar
He has participated in 17 Dakar Rally.

References

External links 
 Biker profile at baja-aragon.com

1962 births
Living people
Dakar Rally drivers
Spanish motorcycle racers
Off-road motorcycle racers
Motorcycle racers from Catalonia
People from Osona
Sportspeople from the Province of Barcelona